Dyes Fork is a stream in the U.S. state of Ohio. It was named for the Dye family, which settled in the area in 1806.

See also
List of rivers of Ohio

References

Rivers of Morgan County, Ohio
Rivers of Noble County, Ohio
Rivers of Ohio